Reboulia hemisphaerica, the hemisphaeric liverwort or small mushroom-headed liverwort, is the only species of liverwort in the genus Reboulia.

A possible second species Reboulia queenslandica (Stephani) M. Hicks was published in 1992, but it was later determined to be a polyploid cross between two varieties of R. hemisphaerica, so not a distinct species. Subsequent lists and publications do not recognize it as distinct.

Riccardin C is a phenolic cyclic bibenzyl secondary metabolite isolated from R. hemisphaerica, as is marchantinquinone.

References

External links

 Marie L. Hicks. 2004. Bryophyte Flora of North America:  Reboulia

Aytoniaceae
Marchantiales genera
Monotypic bryophyte genera